Cels may refer to:

 CelS, Cellulose 1,4-beta-cellobiosidase (reducing end), an enzyme
CELS ratings, a supervisory rating system to classify a bank's overall condition
HUGO Committee on Ethics, Law and Society (CELS) of the Human Genome Organisation
Center for Legal and Social Studies (CELS), Spanish human rights organization presided by Horacio Verbitsky 

Cels (surname)
, Spanish  cartoonist and illustrator, creator of Fanhunter cartoons
 (1841 - 1915 ), Catalan folklorist and engineer .

See also
Cel (disambiguation)